Sri Seshadri Swamigal, also known as the "Saint with a Golden Hand", was an Indian saint born in Kanchipuram, Tamil Nadu, but predominantly lived in Thiruvannaamalai where he  attained Samadhi (state of meditative consciousness).

Life

Birth and childhood
Sri Adi Sankara established specific methods of worship for the goddess Kamakshi and brought 30 devotees and their families from the banks of the Narmada to Kanchipuram to ensure that these methods of worship were adequately followed. These devotees, who had Kamakshi as their family deity and were responsible for the spread of Srividya Upaasana, were called "Kaamakotiyaar." All those belonging to the lineage of the Kaamakotiyaar are devotees of Kamakshi. About 200 years ago, there was a great scholar named Kaamakoti Sastrigal. He did not have a male child but loved the children of his elder brother, Chidambara Sastrigal, particularly the youngest, Maragatham, as his own. When Maragatham was of marriageable age, Kamakoti Sastrigal decided that his disciple, Varadarajan, would be the most suitable match.
 
Varadaraja Sastrigal and Maragatham were yearning for a male child to continue their family lineage. One night, Mother Kamakshi appeared in the Sastrigal's dream and instructed, "Offer butter, and a child of wisdom shall be born".
Providentially, Maragatham conceived. On a Saturday, 22 January 1870, under the auspices of the star/asterism/nakshatra Hastham, a boy child was born as Goddess Kamakshi's prasadam. He was named Seshadri. All the signs of a great soul shining in the future were seen in the child as it grew. Being a gift of Parasakthi, to be immersed in the thoughts of the almighty and to be involved in prayers and worship was but natural.

As a child, Swamigal had spontaneous trances. For example, he would sit on his father's lap in a meditative posture with the chin mudra, while at other times, when his father was teaching a class, he would look at the book as if he was reading and comprehending it. At age four, Seshadri received his nickname, 'Golden Hand' (Tamil: Thanga Kai). One day Seshadri and his mother stopped at a shop full of bronze castings of the Gods. While at the shop, the young lad picked up a statue of Krishna and asked his mother to buy it so he could perform Krishna puja. Thinking that the radiant child resembled Lord Krishna, the trader gave the idol and refused payment. The next day the trader proclaimed the boy to be most lucky as the whole consignment of 1,000 statues (because of the young boy's touch) had been sold in one day, as against his usual sales until then, wherein he was barely able to sell 1-2 idols.

News of the incident spread quickly through the town, and from that moment, the young boy was known as 'The one with the golden hand'. This gave him the name "Thanga Kai" (golden hand). It is mentioned that this idol was worshipped by Sri Seshadri Swamigal himself for many years, after which his younger brother Narasimha Josiar and his descendants continue the worship the same idol to date.

Aged 14, his father, Sri Varadarajar, died unexpectedly. Kamakoti Sastrigal took the family to live at Vazhur. It was there that Swamiji completed his education. Aged 17, his mother died, and Seshadri's uncle (Sri Varadarajar's younger brother, Sri Ramaswami Josiar) and aunt, Kalyani, took charge of Seshadri and the younger brother Narasimha Josiar, as their children since they were childless.

It is said that his mother, Maragatham, on her death bed, advised him to go to Arunachala / Tiruvannamalai, referring to a Shloka that states that the very thought of Arunachala grants Mukthi. Young Seshadri was deeply shaken at that particular moment. Having lost his mother and, with that, both his parents, Seshadri sought refuge in the divine grace, gravitating more and more towards spirituality resulting in intense pooja and tapas, all of which were to reflect shortly in the times to come.

Early adulthood
At the age of 19, he met Sri Balaji Swamigal, a wandering saint from North India, an avadut, who gave Seshadri sannyasa diksha (the only formal diksha Seshadri is said to have) and instructed him in the Mahavakyas, the holy sayings of the 4 Vedas. Shortly after, Seshadri Swamigal started travelling to various Tamil Nadu spots, eventually ending up at Tiruvannamalai at 19. Seshadri Swamigal moved about Tiruvannamalai for 40 years, an ascetic with a total disregard for either name or form.

Journey from Kanchipuram to Tiruvannamalai
On the day of the annual death ceremony for his father, Sri Varadaraja Josiar, his uncle Sri Ramasami Josiar and his aunt Kalyani forcibly brought him home from the streets of Kanchipuram where he was roaming, having renounced the worldly way of life, and locked him inside a room in their home, while the annual ceremonies were underway. When this room was opened after the end of the ceremonies to permit young Seshadri to seek the blessings of the departed souls and the priests performing the ceremonies, they were shocked to find him missing from the locked room. It was the first time the family and the entire town gathered to witness this and were made aware of the greatness of the young Gnani. 

Young Seshadri's journey from thereon took him first to Kaveripakkam which was 20 miles west of Kanchipuram, where some relatives, including Sundarammal, his maternal elder aunt (Periamma), lived. The young saint, however, did not visit his relatives but chose to meditate at the Navaratri Mandapam of Sri Mukteshwarar temple, wherein the presiding deities were GOD Mukteeswarar and Sri Alankaravalli. It is here that while circumambulating the temple, a snake climbed up on the young saint and spread its hood as if to protect the young GOD, which event was witnessed by his young cousin, Seshu, who went back and narrated it to the entire town. This further added to the fame of the young Gnani.

On hearing of his presence at Kaveripakkam, his uncle and aunt, Sri Ramasami Josiar and Kalyani Ammal rushed from Kanchipuram only to find Seshadri Swamigal immersed in meditation in the temple pond with a Lingam made of tamarind rice and curd rice, given as alms by his aunt, Sundarammal of Kaveripakkam.

Despite many entreaties, young Seshadri Swamigal was far too detached and had completely renounced any attachment to the worldly life forcing his relatives to let him pursue a life of a renunciate, Sanyasi and a mendicant. After 2–3 months, his whereabouts were never clearly known, likely because he never spent much time in any one place. He finally arrived at Thindivanam, very close to Tiruvannamalai. By then, he had taken a vow of silence and was known as "Mouna Swamigal" (the Saint in Eternal Silence (Mounam)). A devotee by the name of T.K. Kanniyar requested the priest of the famed Sri Thinthirineeswarar temple to open the temple Yangyasalai for Swamigal to meditate. 

Swamigal requested that the room, typically used for performing Homas fire rituals, be locked from the outside and opened after four months. YYet, in a spate of worry about Swamigal's health, the Sri Kuppuswamy priest opened the same on the 5th day only to find Swamigal in deep meditation. On hearing of the priest's apprehension, Seshadri Swamigal left Thindivanam immediately. Passing through Maarchettikulam, he reached Aiyyanthoppu before his traces were again lost until he resurfaced a few months later in the famed Pandava Caves of ThoosiMamadur village south of Kanchipuram wherein, on hearing of his presence, crowds gathered, which crowds also included Swamigal's biological younger brother, Sri Narasimha Josiar. But before he could meet his older brother, Swamigal had left ThoosiMamadur to reach North Arcot, where he spent some time in Muthukumaraswamy temple and Brahmeswaraswamy temple in Fort Street, North Arcot.

After leaving Tirupattur, he crossed Javvadhu Hills and reached Padavedu, 7 miles from Aathuvaampaadi, where he remained for two days. Both Tirupattur and Aathuvampaadi housed relatives of Swamigal. In retrospect, it may be analyzed that he went through towns that housed his relatives without visiting them to renounce them formally.

Notably, adjoining, Aathuvampaadi is a village called Thurinjikuppam which houses the Jeeva Samadhi called Sanyaasi Paarai, which Swamigal is reported to have visited before finally reaching Tiruvannamalai.

In ancient times, a widower and his young daughter, widowed at a young age, left for Kasi as was the norm 300–400 years ago. While the widower did not want to take along his daughter, she begged and pleaded only to have him relent and take her along. Father and daughter passed through village after village, living off alms from benevolent villagers en route to Kasi.

At Thurinjikuppam, some families cast aspersions on his character resulting in him going bereft of food one day. On inquiring with some kids playing nearby, they playfully said that the village was talking ill of him and his young daughter.

To uphold the truth of his values and that of his daughter, it is said that he ordered her to lie down on a pyre, chanted a hymn to the Sun God, thereby ending her life, instantaneously, and dug a pit in the village pond, and told the same kids to close the pit with mud. The kids, thinking it all to be a game, complied on finding that the sand/stones they were piling on the father were turning into candy.

This Jeeva Samadhi, where this person is entombed in a living state, still stands in this village. and in the Tamil month of Aadi, people from nearby villagers gather to worship this great soul, at the end of which worship, it still rains to this date in this village.

Seshadri Swamigal visited this Samadhi before finally reaching Tiruvannamalai and stayed there until his Samadhi.

His Chittapah, Sri Ramaswami Josiar, rushed to Tiruvannamalai along with Seshadri Swamigal's younger brother, Sri Narasimha Josiar, to inform him of the longing his aunt KalyaniAmmal had for Seshadri and how she died, unable to bear the separation from Sri Seshadri.

As the young saint had become a complete renunciate, his relatives left in resignation after informing authorities to ensure that he was fed properly.

Teachings

The problems from local people increased as his fame spread. While his thoughts, words and action were in perfect harmony with the mental world, he saw and relished, and the mundane world labelled him "Mad", which is a "wise lunatic", and he felt sorry for this world.

Throughout his life and teachings, Sri Seshadri Swamigal continuously emphasised the glory of Arunachala. He often talked about the unique aspects of the Arunachala Kshetra.
He would say: 'This is where Swamy and Ambal invite all and confer liberation', and 'GOD Krishna leaving aside his Sudarshana chakra (divine weapon), is playing on his flute. On hearing it, GOD Siva, inside the mountain, comes out and dances.

Sri Seshadri Swamigal deeply devoted to God, especially in the form of the Goddess Kamakshi, GOD Ram and Arunachala. Sri Seshadri Swamigal was a great worshipper of Shakti. In the practice of concentration, he sat steeped in samadhi, oblivious of his body.

Sri Seshadri Swamigal and Vallimalai Swamigal
Vallimalai Swamigal was a saint (b.1870)  who was responsible for the spread of Tirrupugazh and was a disciple of Bhagavan Sri Ramana Maharshi. Once Bhagavan ordered him to go down to the foot of the Arunachala hill which order Vallimalai Swamigal complied with. At the foot of the hill, Sri Seshadri Swamigal, absorbed in Eternal Consciousness by embracing a buffalo, initiated Vallimalai Swamigal into Aatmatma Girijamati, one of the slokas composed by Sri Adi Shankara. He then told Vallimalai Swamigal to devote his life to the spread of Tirrupugazh.

When Vallimalai Swamigal began spreading the beauty of Tirrupugazh from Vallimalai, once an old man came, asking alms and consumed 1.5 kg of porridge and vanished from the scene, when his disciples went looking for the person with such a ravenous appetite. From the next day, a mongoose would consume the food meant for the old man. Likewise, after Seshadri Swamigal's Mahasamadhi, the caretaker of the burial grounds of Tiruvannamalai yearned to see Swamigal, and Swamigal graced him by telling him to go to Vallimalai. The caretaker saw the mongoose eating the food, people singing Tirupuggazh to it, and suddenly, the mongoose transformed into Seshadri Swamigal before disappearing from there.

A similar miracle was demonstrated to Sri Vallimalai Swamigal when Seshadri Swamigal was in his physical form by telling him to board a train to Vallimalai, promising to join him. Vallimalai Swamigal, on reaching Vallimalai, completing his daily ablutions and turning around, suddenly saw Seshadri Swamigal (who had intentionally missed the train from Tiruvannamalai), saw him transform into a squirrel that jumped onto the nearby trees and disappeared.

Death
Sri Seshadri died on January 4, 1929. His body was not cremated but buried, as is the custom of a saint.

During his final days, Swamigal was afflicted with a fever. Devotees wanted to take a picture of Swamigal, shaved, bathed and dressed him well. They then performed "Pattabhishekam" (Crowning). Swamigal refused, saying he would come down with fever, but finally gave in to his devotees' wishes. It is said that for some months before this, he kept asking a devotee whether he should build a new house and move there, metaphorically asking if he should shed his mortal coil.

As soon as the Pattabhishekam was done, Swamigal came down with a fever the next day, despite which he roamed around town, resulting in his body becoming weak and thin. Finally, he came and sat in the verandah of ilavarasu pattam Chinna gurukkal's house and attained MahaSamadhi.

Sri Seshadri Swamigal was an elder to Bhagavan Sri Ramana Maharshi for ten years. During the final rites, Bhagavan was present throughout Mouna.

Seshadri Swamigal and Ramana Maharshi
Seshadri Swamigal and Ramana Maharshi were contemporaries. Seshadri arrived at Arunachala six years earlier than Ramana. When Ramana Maharshi came to Tiruvannamalai seven years after Seshadri Swamigal's arrival, Seshadri took care of Ramana Maharshi. Sri Seshadri tried to protect the young swami, who seemed entirely unaware of his body and surroundings. He cleansed Ramana's blood-oozing wounds and revealed Ramana as a [saint] to the world.

Bhagavan Sri Ramana Maharshi was called Chinna Seshadri by one and all for the same proclivity to Mouna, deep meditation and Sadhana.

As Bhagavan was driven to Paathala (underground) Lingam in Sri Arunachaleeswarar temple, it was Sri Seshadri Swamigal who protected him.[3] In the Puranas, it is said that when Parasakthi performed penance to Lord Shiva, her son Karthikeya protected her. In the mundane world, Seshadri Swamigal, verily born of Sri Parasakthi's blessings, guarded over Bhagavan Sri Ramana Maharshi, who was considered a manifestation of Lord Kumara, reversing the roles.

Many devotees of one or the other saint have testified in numerous publications that both have verily said that they are the same, on many occasions, such as in the case of Lakshmi Ammal, a devotee of Bhagavan Sri Ramana Maharshi. Seshadri Swamigal, who met her on her way to Bhagavan, responded to her thought, assuaging her in response to her silent prayer, "What's the difference, where you serve, here(Him) or there(Bhagavan Sri Ramana Maharshi)?"

Similarly, a devotee of Bhagavan Sri Ramana Maharshi who took to narcotic substances in pursuit of spirituality, much against Bhagavan's advice, sought refuge with Seshadri Swamigal, who said: "Well, I told you before itself, to avoid it." This comment, to avoid narcotic substances, was made by Bhagavan to the devotee, yet Seshadri Swamigal could respond likewise.

Many people have witnessed conversations and lunches that both Gnanis would share. One Vasudeva Sastri states that, on one occasion, Sri Seshadri Swamigal, after intently observing Bhagavan Sri Ramana Maharshi, asked of Bhagavan, "What is THIS thinking?", later saying, "Paying Obeisance to Arunachala will result in salvation". This led to Bhagavan breaking his Mouna(silence), and replied, "Who is the one paying Obeisance? To whom is the Obeisance being paid?". Subsequently, Bhagavan gave an eloquent one-hour exposition on Advaita, to which Seshadri Swamigal said that he believes in Bhakti alone, went down, prostrated to Arunachala and left.

Contrary to the above comment about faith in Bhakti, Swamigal was always in the non-dual state, as evinced in an incident wherein, while walking along the Agraharam in Tiruvannamalali, he stopped a passerby to ask him while pointing to a tethered buffalo, as to what the passerby sees. The passerby said he saw a buffalo, to which Swamigal corrected him, saying, "This is Brahman" (The Oneness of existence), thereby proving that Swamigal just communicated the same principle of Advaita albeit in a slightly different manner from Bhagavan Sri Ramana Maharshi.

Yet another piece of evidence that both were the same was through the experience of Natesa Mudaliar, who wanted to be graced by Bhagavan Sri Ramana Maharshi but was unable to get the grace of the Guru until he met Sri Seshadri Swamigal, who drove him away, which was taken as a good omen and turned out so, as Bhagavan Sri Ramana Maharshi finally graced him with his tutelage.

Many devotees have often been told that there were three lingams in Tiruvannamalai: Sri Seshadri Swamigal, Bhagavan Sri Ramana Maharshi and Arunachala itself.

His presence in shops, where he would seemingly randomly throw away the cash counter, and throw out the inventory, were all eagerly awaited, resulting in skyrocketing sales.

Similarly, he would be seen roaming around town with a half-shaven face, wearing dirty clothes, oblivious of his surroundings or appearance, absorbed as if he were in Eternal Consciousness.

He would walk into people's homes, such as that of Tilak Shastri, who told his brother that he would lose his kid. The kid who was hale and healthy passed on. Likewise, he walked into one of Arunachalam's houses and told his father to take two bananas before leaving. Arunachalam's critical father made a dramatic recovery. Thus Swamigal's words always came true.

Ashram and temple

The Seshadri Swamigal Ashram is located in Tiruvannamalai, very close to Ramanasramam.

The consecration of the Sundaravadana Perumal temple in Vazhur, associated with Seshadri Swamigals birth, happened on 12 February 2012.

Sri Kamakoti Seshadri Swamigal Nivas
The author of Swamigal's biography, Mr Baranitharan, identified the house from which Seshadri Swamigal performed his mysterious vanishing act, first revealing his spiritual powers by seeking guidance from the then pontiff of Kanchi Kamakoti Peetham, Chandrasekarendra Saraswati.

Kanchi Mahan, advised Sri Baranitharan to first speak to one Ranganathar, then a resident of one of the 5-6 houses, located behind Upanishad Brahma Mutt in Kanchipuram. On contacting Sri Ranganatha Battar, Mr.Baranitharan was told that Sri Seshadri Swamigal's home was in ChinnaKanchipuram, Yannai Kaatti street, with a big garden and grove, as identifying markers.

Mr Baranitharan went with a resident, Padmanabhan, to meet Nallappa Jeeyappangaar, who pointed Mr Baranitharan to a house at the east end of the South Mada Street of Chinna Kanchipuram and gave evidence of an old schoolmate who was a past resident of that house, it has changed four hands since Seshadri Swamigal's time.

When Mr Baranitharan visited that house, while he did find a dense coconut grove, he saw two other new structures in that same yard, one being a house with a tiled roof (Ottu Veedu) next to which there was a small open area, and then a verandah.

It was unclear if the verandah was the remnants of the home from which Swamigal performed his vanishing act, whether it was the structure with a tiled roof or the house that Nallappa Jeeyappangaar had pointed to, as they were all next to each other.

Mr Baranitharan's conversation with Krishnappa Mudaliar at the verandah led him to understand that Krishnappa Mudaliar had built the one-storeyed house pointed out by Nallappa Jeeyappangar, with the owner being Panchaangakara Iyer, whose relatives lived in the tiled house (Ootu Veedu) next to it. Krishnappa Mudaliar confirmed that there was an older adult, likely Ramaswami Josiar, who lived in the tiled roof house, on whose demise the house was sold. Likewise, Panchangakara Iyer also purportedly sold the one-storey home and moved to Periya Kanchipuram.

Despite Mr Baranitharan being pointed to the single-story house, he decided to see the tiled roof (Ootu veedu) house, stepped in, and had a tour which revealed some interesting insights. While the front portion of the house was demolished, there was still a room on the right side of the living room layout, which looked like the room someone could be locked in. At the same time, ceremonies were being carried out in the living room area, leading to Mr Baranitharan wondering if this was the room from where Swamigal vanished.

He went further into the house, and to his surprise, saw a Miththam, an open-to-sky area with a well in the middle, typical of old homes, the most likely place of occurrence of Sri Seshadri Swamigal, purportedly pausing while massaging his uncle, Sri Ramasami Josiar's head with oil, claiming that he saw Gandharvas crossing the sky, singing in Raaga Bilahari. This incident occurred well before Swamigal vanished from a locked room, when he was in the initial stages of his renunciation, spending long hours at temples in Kanchipuram, after the demise of both his parents, and his long absences from home, causing much grief to Sri Ramaswami Josiar.

That this could be the Mittham and, well, where this incident likely occurred prompted Mr Baranitharan and his entourage to take pictures and return to Kanchi Swamigal, who was then camping at Kollachatram.

By his spiritual insight, Sri Chandrasekharendra Saraswati Swamigal confirmed that the Ootu Veedu is the house that Sri Seshadri Swamigal lived in.

On his guidance, Kanchi Kamakoti Peetham purchased the house from the owner, Sri Sivaprakasam, a portrait of Seshadri Swamigal was installed, homas(fire offerings) were performed daily, and a procedure for performing Sri Seshadri Swamigal's Aradhanai was set in place.

This Aradhanai takes place in the Tamil month of Marghazhi Navami.

Likewise, Seshadri Swamigal's Jayanthi was also begun to be celebrated in the month of Thai in the asterism of Hastha, when Seshadri Swamigal was born.

Subsequently, "Unjuvrithi", where people go around the Argaharam chanting Bhajans, was begun, just as in Tirvaiyyaru.

In 1977, rules and regulations for the trust established for preserving and celebrating Sri Seshadri Swamigal's heritage were finalized in the presence of Sri Chandrasekharendra Saraswati Swamigal.

He further gave blessings for a ManiMandapam to be constructed on the house's premises, and when it was completed, it was named "Sri Kamakoti Seshadri Swamigal Nivasam" and inaugurated in 1989.

Television series
Based on His Life and Teachings, DD Podhigai used to telecast a Serial Named as "Sri Seshadri Swamigal Mahathmyam" every Thursday at 7.02 P.M.

References

1870 births
1929 deaths
19th-century Hindu religious leaders
20th-century Hindu religious leaders
Indian Hindu saints